That Bass Tour was the first headlining concert tour by American singer-songwriter Meghan Trainor. It was launched in support of her debut major-label studio album Title (2015), and visited North America, Europe, Asia, and Oceania. The tour was initially announced in November 2014 with North American dates being released at the same time, with Oceanic, European and Asian dates announced afterward. The show was produced by Live Nation Entertainment. The set list featured the majority of the songs from Title, along with a cover of Mark Ronson's "Uptown Funk". Reviews for the tour were generally positive, with critics praising Trainor's prowess performing live.

Background and development
On November 3, 2014, Trainor announced her debut concert tour, That Bass Tour, to support her fourth studio album and major label debut, Title (2015). Tour dates were released on the same day for North America, and tickets were released on November 8, 2014. Dates were also revealed for the United Kingdom and Australia in January 2015. Live Nation Entertainment were announced to be the tour's producers, and HP as its sponsor. The set list included fourteen songs from Trainor's album Title along with a dance section featuring Mark Ronson's "Uptown Funk".

Synopsis
The show starts with a screen of lights in the background while Trainor enters the stage, and she then opens with "Dear Future Husband". After performing another three songs, Trainor starts singing "Title" with only a ukulele and her guitarist. "Bang Dem Sticks" is later performed along with a drum solo, which is followed by a special dance segment, as a tribute to Mark Ronson's song "Uptown Funk" featuring Bruno Mars. As the first song of the encore, she sings "What If I" which was accompanied by a disco ball. The show closes with "All About That Bass", which Bill Brotherton of the Boston Herald said had "a loud sing-along and had moms, dads and preteens dancing feverishly". The show ends with large balloons and confetti falling from the ceiling.

Critical reception
Carlee Wright of USA Today praised the show, saying that Trainor was energetic during the show, and that she interacted with the crowd often, both between and during songs. She also said that Trainor "brought her A-game" for the show and that she recommends buying tickets for the show. Annabel Ross from The Sydney Morning Herald rated the song three out of five stars, and described Trainor as a "pop star for all the family" in the review. The Hollywood Reporters Ashley Lee said that the show did not disappoint the crowd, and also praised Trainor's vocals and her showmanship. David Pollock of The Independent praised the show and opined that it is "positively rich in visual spectacle and a sense of authentically live performance". International Business Timess Alicia Adejobi criticized Trainor's dance routines in the "Uptown Funk" segment, saying that she's not the "best dancer".

Portland Tribunes Nicole DeCosta said Trainor described Trainor as laid back and her dance moves as "G-rated", although Owen R. Smith from The Seattle Times said that the lyrical subjects of the songs on the show's set list did not fit its young audience. Ashley Lee from The Hollywood Reporter said that the show's venue was "intima[te]", and that Trainor took advantage of this. John Aizlewood of the London Evening Standard wrote that Trainor had a "natural presence" in the show and that she "spread more than a little happiness".

Set list
Set list for the March 13, 2015, show.
 "Dear Future Husband"
 "Mr. Almost"
 "Credit"
 "No Good for You"
 "Title"
 "Walkashame"
 "Close Your Eyes"
 "3am"
 "Like I'm Gonna Lose You"
 "Bang Dem Sticks"
 "Uptown Funk"
 "My Selfish Heart"
 "Lips Are Movin"

Encore:
 "What If I"
 "All About That Bass"

Shows

Box score office data

Notes

References

External links
 Meghan Trainor's official website

Meghan Trainor concert tours
2015 concert tours